American V: A Hundred Highways is a posthumously released studio album by Johnny Cash. It was released on July 4, 2006, by American Recordings. As the title implies, it is the fifth entry in Cash's American series. Like its predecessors, the album is produced by Rick Rubin. It was Cash's first No. 1 album in 37 years. It was certified Gold on August 18, 2006, by the RIAA.

Background
As with the other albums in the American series, the album includes covers and originals. The originals on this album are "I Came to Believe" and "Like the 309", the latter of which was the last song Cash wrote before passing away in 2003. Recorded on August 21, 2003, "Like the 309" was the next-to-last song Cash ever recorded; the last being "Engine One-Forty-Three" which was produced by John Carter Cash and released on the 2004 compilation album The Unbroken Circle: The Musical Heritage of the Carter Family. The album takes its name from a lyric on the track "Love's Been Good to Me" by Rod McKuen.

Previous recordings
Three songs on the album are updated versions of songs previously recorded by Cash.
"Help Me" was previously recorded by Cash for his 1973 album "The Gospel Road".
"I Came to Believe" was previously recorded by Cash in the 1980s during the recording sessions that would ultimately result in the posthumous 2014 release Out Among the Stars.
"I'm Free from the Chain Gang Now" was previously recorded by Cash for his 1962 album The Sound of Johnny Cash.

Chart performance
American V: A Hundred Highways peaked at No. 1 on the US Billboard 200 with 88,000 copies sold in the United States, according to Nielsen SoundScan. It was Cash's first No. 1 album since 1969's Johnny Cash at San Quentin.

Track listing

Personnel
Cash engineer David "Fergie" Ferguson (assisted by Jimmy Tittle) and Rubin oversaw the completion of the recordings. Other musicians on the album include keyboardist Benmont Tench and guitarists Mike Campbell, Smoky Hormel, Matt Sweeney and Jonny Polonsky.

Johnny Cash – vocal, guitar
Laura Cash – fiddle
Dennis Crouch (bassist) – bass guitar
Smokey Hormel – guitar
Pat McLaughlin – guitar
Larry Perkins – guitar
Jonny Polonsky – guitar
Randy Scruggs – guitar
Marty Stuart – guitar
Matt Sweeney – guitar
Benmont Tench – organ, piano, harpsichord
Pete Wade – guitar
Mac Wiseman – guitar
Martyn Atkins – photography
Christine Cano – art direction, design
John Carter Cash – executive producer
Lindsay Chase – production coordination
Greg Fidelman – mixing
Paul Figueroa – mixing assistant
Dan Leffler – mixing assistant
Vlado Meller – mastering
Rick Rubin – producer, liner notes
David Campbell - string arranger
Mark Santangelo – mastering assistant
Jimmy Tittle – assistant engineer

Charts

Weekly charts

Year-end charts

Certifications

References

External links
"American V: A Hundred Highways" Review on "Cool Album of the Day" 
USATODAY.com - Johnny Cash's final work yields 2 more albums
E! Online News - Johnny Cash's Last "American" Song
THE POP LIFE; Johnny Cash's Legacy Of Emotions, on CD's. New York Times (reprinted on JohnnyCashMusic.com). November 27, 2003.
Cash Earns First No. 1 Album Since 1969. Billboard  July 12, 2006.
Luma Electronic's Johnny Cash discography listing

2006 albums
Albums produced by Rick Rubin
American Recordings (record label) albums
Johnny Cash albums
Lost Highway Records albums
Albums published posthumously
Sequel albums
Covers albums